Mount Devol is the ice-covered mountain rising to 1626 m in Lassus Mountains, northern Alexander Island in Antarctica.  It surmounts Nichols Snowfield to the east and Narechen Glacier to the west. The feature is named after the town and region of Devol in medieval Southwestern Bulgaria.

Location

Maps
 British Antarctic Territory. Scale 1:200000 topographic map. DOS 610 – W 69 70. Tolworth, UK, 1971
 Antarctic Digital Database (ADD). Scale 1:250000 topographic map of Antarctica. Scientific Committee on Antarctic Research (SCAR). Since 1993, regularly upgraded and updated

Notes

References
 Bulgarian Antarctic Gazetteer. Antarctic Place-names Commission. (details in Bulgarian, basic data in English)
 Mount Devol. SCAR Composite Gazetteer of Antarctica

External links
 Mount Devol. Copernix satellite image

Devol
Bulgaria and the Antarctic